Musanus was an early Christian writer mentioned briefly by Eusebius in his Church History as the author of a book, extant in his time, against the Encratites. Jerome, probably based on Eusebius, also wrote about him in De Viris Illustribus (c. 31).

References

Year of birth unknown
Year of death unknown
Christian writers